Gran Turismo is an upcoming American biographical coming of age sports drama film directed by Neill Blomkamp from a screenplay by Jason Hall and Zach Baylin. Produced by Columbia Pictures, PlayStation Productions, Trigger Street Productions, and 2.0 Entertainment, the film is based on the video game series of the same name developed by Polyphony Digital. Also based on a true story, the film stars Archie Madekwe as Jann Mardenborough, a teenage Gran Turismo player aspiring to be a race car driver. It also stars David Harbour, Orlando Bloom, Darren Barnet, Geri Halliwell Horner, and Djimon Hounsou.

Development of a film based on Gran Turismo began in 2013, with Michael De Luca and Dana Brunetti producing it, with a script by Alex Tse. In 2015, Joseph Kosinski was set to direct the film, and Jon and Erich Hoeber would write a new screenplay. By 2018, the Kosinski version was no longer moving forward. In May 2022, a new iteration of the Gran Turismo film started development, with Blomkamp eyed to direct. The main cast were confirmed in September, while other cast additions were signed in November. Filming began in Hungary in the same month, and wrapped in December 2022.

Gran Turismo is set to be released on August 11, 2023 by Sony Pictures Releasing.

Premise 
The film is about a  Gran Turismo player whose gaming skills won a series of Nissan-sponsored video game competitions to become an actual professional race car driver.

Cast 
 Archie Madekwe as Jann Mardenborough, an aspiring teenage driver
 David Harbour as Jack Salter, Jann's trainer
 Orlando Bloom as Danny Moore, a motorsport marketing executive
 Darren Barnet as a top GT Academy driver threatened by Jann's success
 Djimon Hounsou as Steve Mardenborough
 Geri Halliwell as Jann's mother
 Daniel Puig as Jann's brother
 Josha Stradowski as a rival driver
 Thomas Kretschmann
 Maeve Courtier-Lilley
 Richard Cambridge as Felix 
 Emelia Hartford
 Pepe Barroso
 Sang Heon Lee
 Max Mundt
 Mariano González
 Harki Bhambra
 Lindsay Pattison
 Théo Christine
 Nikhil Parmar

Production

Development 
In May 2022, it was announced that a film adaptation of Polyphony Digital's Gran Turismo video games was in early development at Sony Pictures and PlayStation Productions.  Shortly afterward, Neill Blomkamp was hired to direct a screenplay written by Jason Hall, and Sony set a release date of August 11, 2023. The lead roles were cast in September 2022 with David Harbour as a veteran race car driver who mentors Archie Madekwe as the teenage trainee. Orlando Bloom was cast as a motorsport marketing executive and Darren Barnet as a threatened GT Academy racer. Additional cast additions were announced while filming in November included Djimon Hounsou, Geri Halliwell-Horner, Daniel Puig, Josha Stradowski, Thomas Kretschmann, Maeve Courtier-Lilley, Emelia Hartford, Pepe Barroso, and Sang Heon Lee. Max Mundt, Mariano González, Harki Bhambra, Lindsay Pattison, Théo Christine, and Nikhil Parmar were added to the cast in December 2022.

Filming 

Filming began in Hungary in November, and wrapped in December 2022, with Jacques Jouffret serving as cinematographer.

Music 
In September 2022, it was reported that Stephen Barton would compose the score for the film.

References

External links 
 

2023 drama films
2020s American films
2020s biographical drama films
2020s coming-of-age drama films
2020s English-language films
2020s sports drama films
American auto racing films
American biographical drama films
American coming-of-age drama films
American sports drama films
Biographical films about sportspeople
Columbia Pictures films
Films based on Sony Interactive Entertainment video games
Films directed by Neill Blomkamp
Films produced by Doug Belgrad
Films shot in Hungary
Gran Turismo (series)
Live-action films based on video games
PlayStation Productions